Erasmus Darwin House in Lichfield, Staffordshire is the former home of the English poet and physician Erasmus Darwin, grandfather of naturalist Charles Darwin. The house is a Grade I listed building, and is now a writer's house museum commemorating Erasmus Darwin's life.

Erasmus Darwin was a physician, scientist, inventor, poet, and educationalist, and lived on Beacon Street from 1758 until 1781. A founding member of the Lunar Society, it was here that he received many notable 18th-century personalities, including Josiah Wedgwood, Matthew Boulton, Benjamin Franklin and James Watt.

History of the house

Darwin purchased a medieval half-timbered building on the west side of the lower courtyard of the Vicars Choral in 1758. From 1758 to 1759 Darwin converted the building into a large Georgian town house of red brick with stucco dressings and Venetian windows. At this time the front of the house was separated from Beacon Street by a narrow deep ditch which once formed the moat of the Cathedral Close. Darwin built a bridge across the ditch descending from his hall door to the street. The ditch was overgrown with tangled bushes, which Darwin cleared and made a terrace on the bank. He planted the ditch with lilacs and rose bushes which screened his terrace from passers by. After Darwin left in 1781 the next owner filled in the ditch to make a driveway from the street to his doorway.

Erasmus Darwin at home in Lichfield 
After the Darwins moved into the new front of their house, a wooden bridge was thrown across the ditch and a twin-tier terrace was built, causing alterations to be made to the basement windows.

For 20 years this house was the base for Darwin's medical practice, for his scientific experiments, meetings of the Lunar Society, and such inventive schemes as the construction of the Trent and Mersey Canal. Amid all this, the house was also the centre of family life.

Events and exhibits 

Erasmus Darwin House recently relaunched two exhibition rooms, with audio and visual interactives.

The house is also involved in the Lichfield festival and annually takes part in the medieval market.

Heritage weekend has the museum open to the public for free and cellar tours are also available.

Halloween is a popular event for the house when it hosts its 'Haunted House Night' which includes storytelling, apple bobbing, games, facepainting, arts and crafts and its freeky food and drink stall. Cellar tours are pre-booked.

Erasmus Darwin House has a revamped the 'Erasmus Study' Exhibition Room with a computer microscope, touch screen games and quizzes and other interactives. The parlour now has two armchairs with headphones to listen to poetry etc. and a conversation between Erasmus Darwin and Anna Seward after the death of his first wife.

The parlour has been recently restored and now holds an antique grandfather clock. The room also includes comfy armchairs with headphones where you can listen to Erasmus Darwin's poetry and ideas of evolution.

Erasmus Darwin House also has a restored Georgian herb garden that has been faithfully recreated with plantings of the period and features a relief sculpture of Erasmus Darwin and incised text on paving slabs leading to the house created by Denis Parsons.

The museum has become popular with its Erasmouse Hunt that involves finding 26 'mice' located around the house. Winners get their own woolly 'Erasmouse'. There has been locally noted a few adults euthasiast that enjoy the hunt also.

Museum today 
Erasmus Darwin House is run by a charitable foundation and relies on public donations. Since 2015 there is no entry fee but visitors are encouraged to leave a donation.

The museum includes a gift shop and sells a range of gifts and books.

The cellar is usually  open to visitors via guided tours on the first and third Saturdays of each month.

Erasmus Darwin House is available for conferences, receptions, parties and weddings.  Three rooms are available for hire. The largest is the Seminar Room, capable of holding up to 36 people. The Exhibition Room can accommodate up to 20 people and the Library can be used for small meetings and interviews.

See also
Grade I listed buildings in Staffordshire
Listed buildings in Lichfield

References

Buildings and structures in Lichfield
Historic house museums in Staffordshire
Biographical museums in Staffordshire
Science museums in England
Literary museums in England
Grade I listed houses in Staffordshire
Grade I listed museum buildings
Museums in Staffordshire
Science and technology in Staffordshire